Silvanoprus is a genus of beetles in the family Silvanidae, containing the following species:

Species
 Silvanoprus angusticollis Reitter
 Silvanoprus birmanicus Grouvelle
 Silvanoprus cephalotes Reitter
 Silvanoprus desaegeri Lefkovitch
 Silvanoprus distinguendus Sen Gupta & Pal
 Silvanoprus fagi Guerin
 Silvanoprus feae Grouvelle
 Silvanoprus frater Grouvelle
 Silvanoprus indicus Pal & Sen Gupta
 Silvanoprus insidiosus Grouvelle
 Silvanoprus longicollis Reitter
 Silvanoprus orientalis Grouvelle
 Silvanoprus parallelocollis Reitter
 Silvanoprus porrectus Walker
 Silvanoprus scuticollis Walker
 Silvanoprus sikhotensis Krivolutskaja
 Silvanoprus tenuicollis Grouvelle

References

Silvanidae genera